Black Queen, in comics, may refer to:

Marvel Comics characters, members of Hellfire Club:
Phoenix (comics) (pretending to be Jean Grey), member of The Lords Cardinal
Selene (comics), replaced Phoenix after the Dark Phoenix Saga
Emma Steed, part of the London branch's Inner Circle
Emma Frost, the former White Queen used the alias when she was part of the Dark X-Men
DC Comics characters, who are members of Checkmate:
Patricia Grace-Colby, during the events around The OMAC Project
Sasha Bordeaux, in the post-Infinite Crisis line-up

See also
Black Queen (disambiguation)
White Queen (comics)
Black King (comics)